(official English title: Collateral Damage) is Japanese singer-songwriter Ringo Sheena's digital single (the 17th single overall), released on May 16, 2012. 
The song is featured as the theme song for the Japanese television drama Ataru. 
"Jiyū e Michizure" reached number one in iTunes Store charts, peaked at 5 on the Japan Hot 100, and at 7 on the RIAJ Digital Track Chart.  It was certified gold for 100,000 copies downloaded to computers in 2013.

Sheena wrote the song at the request of the TV program's staff.

Music video 
The music video for "Jiyū e Michizure" was directed by Yasuyuki Ozeki. Sheena didn’t appear on the music video, and Nana Komatsu starred in the video instead.

Track listing

Chart rankings

Certifications

Personnel

Personnel details were sourced from Hi Izuru Tokoro's liner notes booklet.

Hayashi (from Polysics) – guitars
Satoshi Ishihara (from Going Under Ground) – bass guitar
Makoto Sakurai (from Dragon Ash) – drums
Ringo Sheena – arrangement, songwriting, vocals

Notes and references

Ringo Sheena songs
2012 songs
2012 singles
Songs written by Ringo Sheena
Japanese television drama theme songs